Kim Ho (born 15 March 1998) is a South Korean footballer who currently plays as a midfielder for FC Gifu.

Career statistics

Club
.

Notes

References

External links

1998 births
Living people
Korea University alumni
South Korean footballers
South Korea youth international footballers
South Korean expatriate footballers
Association football midfielders
J3 League players
FC Gifu players
South Korean expatriate sportspeople in Japan
Expatriate footballers in Japan